{{Infobox boxing match
| fight date = November 18, 1994
| Fight Name = The Uncivil War
| location = MGM Grand Garden Arena, Paradise, Nevada, US
| image = 
| fighter1 = James Toney
| nickname1 = Lights Out
| record1 = 44–0–2 (29 KO)
| height1 = 5 ft 10 in
| weight1 = 167 lb
| style1 = Orthodox
| hometown1 = Grand Rapids, Michigan, US
| recognition1 = IBF super middleweight champion[[The Ring (magazine)|The Ring]] No. 3 ranked pound-for-pound fighter2-division world champion
| fighter2 = Roy Jones Jr.
| nickname2 = Junior
| record2 = 26–0 (23 KO)
| hometown2 = Pensacola, Florida, US
| height2 = 5 ft 11 in
| weight2 = 168 lb
| style2 = Orthodox
| recognition2 =The Ring No. 8 ranked pound-for-pound fighterFormer middleweight champion
| titles = IBF super middleweight title
| result = Jones Jr. wins via 12–round unanimous decision (119–108, 117–110, 118–109)
}}
James Toney vs. Roy Jones Jr., billed as The Uncivil War'', was a professional boxing match held on November 18, 1994, for the IBF super middleweight championship.

Background
In September 1994, promoter Bob Arum officially announced the highly anticipated title fight between undefeated fighters James Toney and Roy Jones Jr. Toney came into the fight as the IBF super middleweight champion, having won the title on February 13, 1993, from Iran Barkley and having since successfully defended the title three times. Jones, the reigning IBF middleweight champion since defeating Bernard Hopkins on May 22, 1993, had defended the middleweight belt only once before vacating the title in order to move up to the super middleweight division and challenge Toney. The men were considered to be two of the top fighters in the sport. Toney was ranked number two in the pound-for-pound rankings, while Jones was number three. Only then-WBC welterweight champion Pernell Whitaker was ranked ahead of them.

The fight
Though Toney came into the fight as the slight favorite, he struggled to get down to the required weight of 168 pounds and, as a result, appeared sluggish throughout the match. Jones dominated nearly the entire fight and won a unanimous decision. Only one official knockdown occurred during the fight, a left hook from Jones which sent Toney stumbling back into a corner. He nearly fell down, though he was able to keep his balance with the help of the ropes and remained on his feet. Nevertheless, referee Richard Steele ruled it a knockdown, and Toney was forced to take a standing eight count. It was only the second time that Toney had been knocked down. In his previous 46 fights, only Reggie Johnson had scored a knockdown over Toney. After the knockdown, Jones would continue to dictate the pace of the fight, constantly using his speed to land combinations and avoid Toney's offense. When the fight ended and went to the judges' scorecards, all three had different scores, all with Jones ahead.  Jones won the unanimous decision victory with scores of 119–108, 118–109, and 117–110.

References

1994 in boxing
Toney
Boxing in Las Vegas
1994 in sports in Nevada
November 1994 sports events in the United States
MGM Grand Garden Arena